The comic book character Spider-Man has had much media attention due to his popularity as a superhero, as have his villains. Here is a list of his primary villains that have undergone media attention such as in films, televisions, and video games as well as some villains who debuted in the TV series.

Film

This is a list of Spider-Man enemies that have been in Sam Raimi's Spider-Man film trilogy, Marc Webb's The Amazing Spider-Man films, the Marvel Cinematic Universe (MCU), and Sony's Spider-Man Universe.

The movies in the original trilogy also introduces Dylan Baker as Dr. Curt Connors, the man who in the comics becomes the Lizard, but this transformation never took place during Raimi's tenure as director. Mendel Stromm was portrayed by actor Ron Perkins in Spider-Man, although he did not become a villain while Spider-Man 2 features Daniel Gillies as John Jameson, whose transformation into the Man-Wolf is not depicted in the film. Additionally, the Kingpin was featured prominently in the Mark Steven Johnson film Daredevil, where he was portrayed by Michael Clarke Duncan.

In The Amazing Spider-Man, the Lizard is the villain. Irrfan Khan also portrays the antagonistic Dr. Ratha in that film.

In Spider-Man: Homecoming, Michael Mando appears as Mac Gargan, but did not become Scorpion. In Spider-Man: Far From Home, Jake Gyllenhaal portrays Mysterio, who was originally to be played by Bruce Campbell in Raimi's canceled fourth film.

Additionally, although the character has not appeared in an MCU film yet, Vincent D'Onofrio portrays the Kingpin in Marvel Television's Netflix series Daredevil and the Disney+ series Hawkeye.

Live-action films

Animated films

Television
A number of Spider-Man villains have made appearances in Spider-Man television series or other Marvel Comics related shows mostly in animation. Also, in Wolverine and the X-Men, there was a character that closely resembles Shadrac. Here is a listing in alphabetical order.

Sinister Six

A few of Spider-Man villains in other media have joined the group Sinister Six (or Insidious Six in Spider-Man: The Animated Series and Sinister Seven or Superior Sinister Six in Ultimate Spider-Man) to take down Spider-Man just like in the comics. Here is a list of villains who have joined. The numbers beside the supervillain with the parentheses in between them stand for their first meeting and second meeting and so on. There has never been a proper depiction of the original Sinister Six (Doctor Octopus, Mysterio, Vulture, Sandman, Kraven and Electro), but in most franchises, all of the members appear, mainly without joining.

Made-for-TV villains
These villains do not appear in the comics. They were created for various cartoon series. Among them are:

Spider-Man (1967)

 Baron von Rantenraven (voiced by Tom Harvey) - A German pilot who commanded Sky Harbor, which he used to invade New York with World War I biplanes. He uses paralyzing devices.
 Blackwell the Magician (voiced by Chris Wiggins) - Not a proper villain, but a powerful stage magician who tries to get Spider-Man's help to prevent the old Castle theater from being torn down, with former actors Emily Thorndike and James Booth. Later, the Green Goblin steals some of his magical equipment, but Blackwell helps Spider-Man defeat him.
 Blotto - A monster brought to life by Clive's "Spirit Scope" for getting revenge on the world. It starts consuming the city, but it is destroyed when the "Spirit Scope" is used again on it by Spider-Man, turning it to a papery substance.
 Bolton (voiced by Len Carlson) - A giant Martian warrior who can throw thunderbolts and was sent to invade Earth. He was freed from Spider-Man's webbing by the Boomer, who then led Bolton to the "Gold Bullion Building", before he is accidentally sent away from Earth by one of his own thunderbolts. He is not to be confused with Thor.
 Boomer (voiced by Chris Wiggins) - A crook who used explosives to rob banks with his partner the Borer due to lightning covering the sound. He commanded Bolton after freeing them, but after their defeat Spider-Man knocks him out.
 Charles Cameo (voiced by Claude Ray in the first appearance, Carl Banas in the second appearance) - A former actor who used disguises to commit crimes. He once impersonated the Prime Minister of Rutania to steal charity money and later impersonated well-known figures and finally Spider-Man to steal art treasures, but both times was exposed.
 Brutus - The thuggish getaway driver for Charles Cameo, webbed up by Spider-Man.
 Carol - A young woman who is a part of a race of spider-men from another planet. She started stealing scientific equipment to help save her people.
 Clive (voiced by Tom Harvey) - A movie producer who planned revenge on the movie critics and audiences by creating the monster Blotto with his "Spirit Scope" while hiding in a power plant.
 Collin - The dwarfish assistant of Clive. He is accidentally paralyzed by Clive's "Spirit Scope", but the Mayor later mentions he responded to treatment.
 Desperado (voiced by Bernard Cowan) - A cowboy-themed thief armed with hypnotic guns. He flew around on a robotic horse equipped with a helicopter-like rotor.
 De Vargas - A Spanish conquistador who ruled a golden Aztec city in the Andes (it is never explained what the Aztecs were doing in the Andes).
 Dr. Atlantean (voiced by Tom Harvey) - A scientist from Atlantis who brought Manhattan underwater as part of a plan to help the Atlanteans invade. He is a redrawn version of the Master Technician/Radiation Specialist.
 Dr. Cool - A diamond thief who put Spider-Man in a freezer that was somehow able to be set to absolute zero.
 Dr. Dumpty - Full name Dr. Humperdink Dumpty; a thief who stole the jewels of actor Rachel Welles when he attacked a parade. He utilized a small variety of balloon-themed weapons.
 Dr. Genie - An evil female genie disguised as a woman named "Melissa Genie".
 Dr. Magneto (voiced by Bernard Cowan) - Real name Dr. Matto Magneto (pronounced mag-net-o), he is a scientist armed with a gun that could magnetize and de-magnetize metals and non-metals. He planned revenge upon the world for refusing to induct him into the Science Hall of Fame. Using anti-magnetic webbing, Spider-Man defeated Dr. Magneto.
 Dr. Manta (voiced by Carl Banas) - Actually a Rocket Robin Hood villain. He used giant, mechanical beetles and other monsters (all controlled by playing an organ) to enslave an island's inhabitants and planned to use them to mine a mineral which would give him great power.
 Dr. Noah Boddy (voiced by Henry Ramer) - A brilliant scientist who has somehow found a way to make himself invisible. In his first appearance, he took revenge on J. Jonah Jameson for ridiculing his theories of invisibility. In the second appearance, he broke Electro, the Green Goblin, and the Vulture out of jail to take out Spider-Man. Spider-Man makes them fight among themselves using ventriloquism, then webs up Dr. Noah Boddy, who is then jailed.
 Dr. Vespasian - A criminal scientist who developed a drinkable invisibility serum that he tested on himself and his dog Brutus and who tried to get the cooperation of the city's major criminals by getting rid of Spider-Man, before being captured in ice cream by Spider-Man.
 Dr. Von Schlick (voiced by Bernard Cowan) - An evil scientist who wore a rubber, non-stick costume with petroleum-based bubbles emitted from his fingers. Spider-Man had to use a special webbing to stop him.
 Dr. Zap - An electricity-powered scientist who kidnapped Dr. Irving Caldwell in order to learn the secrets of Dr. Caldwell's levitation helmet.
 Fakir (voiced by Paul Soles) - An Arabian fakir whose flute could move objects, cast illusions, and control alligators.
 Fiddler (voiced by Paul Kligman) - Otherwise only known as "Otto", Fiddler is a man whose violin was capable of concussive blasts and disintegrating objects. He was angry that rock music was overcoming classical music.
 Gator - An alligator that was given superhuman intelligence by Doctor Curt Conner. Its appearance was made from recycled footage of the Lizard's episode.
 Harley Clivendon (voiced by Chris Wiggins) - An Australian game hunter who once hypnotized J. Jonah Jameson with an idol so that he could steal their money with the help of an Aborigine. He later tried to find the Fountain of Youth.
 Human Fly Twins - Real names Stan Patterson (voiced by Len Carlson in the first appearance, Alfie Scopp in the second appearance) and Lee Patterson (voiced by Paul Kligman in the first appearance, Henry Ramer in the second appearance), they are former circus performers who robbed people with their ability to scale walls. They once impersonated Spider-Man. Not to be confused with the Human Fly found in the mainstream comics.
 Infinata (voiced by Chris Wiggins) - Actually a Rocket Robin Hood villain. Infinata is from Dementia Five in the Fifth Dimension. He attempted to steal the Library of Gorth from a dying scientist who came from the destroyed planet Gorth, but Spider-Man discovered all of his power is based on fear.
 Master Technician/Radiation Specialist - A mad scientist who took over Manhattan's new and only nuclear power plant and uses a special ray in it to lift Manhattan into the clouds unless the city met his demands like amnesty from arrest and the right to make his own power plant. He had a radiation gun, which gave Spider-Man a disadvantage. In his next appearance, he is released from prison and uses radiation that takes over nearly all of the city's minds. In "Swing City," he is named the Master Technician. In "Specialists and Slaves," he is the Radiation Specialist. The episode "Up From Nowhere" features Dr. Atlantean who is a slightly redrawn Master Technician.
 Master Vine (voiced by Tom Harvey) - The leader of a prehistoric race of plant people that lives off of radium energy. In a redone appearance, the people used a machine that cools the environment.
 Micro Man - Real name Professor Pretorius, a diabolical scientist who created a light bulb that could shrink him to a small size and planned to destroy New York with a nuclear weapon he called "The Kingdom Come Device" after breaking out of prison. The name "Micro Man" comes from the title of the episode, and is not used in the episode itself.
 Miss Trubble - A middle-aged woman with a chest that enabled her to summon living statue versions of Greek mythological gods, goddesses and creatures.
 Mole (voiced by Tom Harvey) - Leader of the Molemen who led his kind into stealing buildings. His appearance used footage of Mugs Riley's Moleman disguise.
 Mugs Reilly (voiced by Tom Harvey) - A criminal who escaped from jail and discovered an underground society of Molemen. He used them to steal entire banks while disguised as their leader, but was unmasked by Spider-Man.
 Parafino (voiced by Len Carlson) - Owner of Parafino's Wax Museum, he is able to create living wax sculptures and trap people in suspended animation. He once used wax mannequins of Blackbeard, Jesse James (voiced by Jack Mather), and the Executioner of Paris (voiced by Max Ferguson) to commit crimes.
 Pardo (voiced by Gillie Fenwick) - A strange-looking man who could turn into an enormous black house cat composed of "pure energy" with hypnotic (and possibly teleporting) vision. When the black cat is electrocuted, all that is left is Pardo's clothes.
 Phantom (voiced by Max Ferguson in the first appearance, Alfie Scopp in the second appearance) - Some sort of inventor, he appeared in "The Fifth Avenue Phantom" and "The Dark Terrors". He used a device that shrank valuables as well as android women who masqueraded as department store mannequins. In his second appearance, he used a Shadow-Scope to create shadow monsters to commit crimes.
 Plotter (voiced by Gillie Fenwick) - The Plotter is a criminal mastermind who hires Ox and Cowboy to steal a blueprint for a missile and has a hideout of sophisticated technology.
 Plutonians - Not proper villains, but large ice beings from Pluto with freezing powers who attempt to kidnap Dr. Smartyr so that they can use his space warp-drive to leave Earth. After Spider-Man hears this story from the Plutonian Leader (voiced by Bernard Cowan), Spider-Man and Dr. Smartyr help them leave Earth at the end of the episode.
 Ponce de León - A centuries-old Spanish conquistador who found the Fountain of Youth and kidnapped Dr. Conner to prevent it from being discovered, although his cannon accidentally destroys it and he disappears. Never actually named, Dr. Conner and Spider-Man say the character just may have been Ponce de Leon around the end of the episode.
 Red Dog Melvin - A criminal who was assisted by Parafino.
 Robot - A huge metal-eating robot; it is unexplained where it came from. Spider-Man defeated it by causing it to fall into the water and short-circuit.
 Scarf - A thief who projected psychedelic images into the sky and stole things during the confusion.
 Scarlet Sorcerer (voiced by Carl Banas) - An ancient Egyptian sorcerer named Kotep who was defeated by his opponent Brazman and placed in suspended animation until a professor at Peter Parker's school used an incantation to awaken him 7,000 years later. He was followed by an army of demons who said they would only obey him if he defeated Spider-Man. Without his scepter, the Scarlet Sorcerer loses his power. When Spider-Man breaks it, he goes back into the depths of time.
 Shakespeare - A gentleman thief whose gang dressed up in gorilla suits after some were let loose at a zoo to steal diamonds.
 Sir Galahad - A thief dressed in a full suit of armor who rode a motorcycle and armed himself with an electrified lance.
 Skymaster - A criminal that hated all "ground-dwellers", riding in his blimp.
 Snowman - A snowman brought to life by a chemical reaction and electrical charge. Spider-Man defeated the Snowman by electrocuting him. He is only briefly named the "Snow Master" by J. Jonah Jameson in the closing moments of the episode.
 Super Swami - A swami called Coga with a talent for creating illusions. He was eventually knocked into a river by Spider-Man and jailed.

Spider-Man (1981 TV series)

 Gadgeteer (voiced by Richard Ramos) - Joshua is an evil and jealous janitor who seeking to gain attention takes on this identity to steal Dr. Norton's shrink ray.
 Nephilia (voiced by Jeff David) - A scientist named Dr. Bradley Shaw and his assistant Penny plotted to attain Spider-Man's blood and a DNA sample of a Nephilia spider into order to duplicate his powers use them for Bradley's own needs. Unfortunately, he ends up becoming Nephilia: a mutant with a man's torso and a spider body from the waist down. When Penny ends up betraying Nephilia by cutting the boxcar containing gold loose, Nephilia helps Spider-Man stop the runaway boxcar. After Penny was stopped, Spider-Man gave him an antidote to return him to normal.
 Professor Gizmo (voiced by Regis Cordic) - Professor Gizmo is a master criminal who planned to use Spider-Man to attach an antenna to the large sunken treasure ship, the El Conquistador.
 Sidewinder (voiced by Philip L. Clarke) - Sidewinder is a masked cowboy villain who rides a flying robot horse. He leads a gang of cowboys who also ride flying robot horses. Spider-Man managed to defeat Sidewinder and discover that he is Wild Willie Wilson who had pulled the robberies that framed the original owner of the Rodeo Show.
 Stuntman (voiced by Peter Cullen) - Jack Riven was the World's Greatest Stuntman until an accident permanently fused him to a mechanical suit of armor a few years ago. He blames Spider-Man for that. Stuntman has two lackey named Larry and Moe (voiced by Gene Ross and Jack Angel) who help make up the Triangle of Evil.

Spider-Man and His Amazing Friends (1981)

 Arachnoid (voiced by Dan Gilvezan) - Zoltan is a chemical scientist who creates a Spider Serum that will give him Spider Powers. He impersonates and frames Spider-Man when committing crimes until he mutates into the Arachnoid: a mutant with the torso of a man and a spider's body from the waist down. His assistant Monica gives the Spider Friends the antidote to return Zoltan to normal.
 Buzz Mason - He is a S.H.I.E.L.D. agent who secretly mind-controlled Lightwave into committing robberies of a device that will enable him to control a satellite called the GUARDSTAR.
 Cyberiad (voiced by Dennis Marks) - Nathan Price was Firestar's boyfriend until an accident caused by an attack by A.I.M. caused him to end up as a cyborg called Cyberiad. He attacked the X-Men Mansion and captured its members one-by-one. His design is based on Fatal Five member Tharok.
 Gamesman - The Gamesman plotted to cause havoc in New York by using the arcade games to hypnotize the teenagers there. He unwittingly caused Francis Byte to become Videoman resulting in Gamesman to manipulate him.
 Lightwave (voiced by Marlene Aragon) - Aurora Dante is Iceman's half-sister who can manipulate and control light. She is an agent of S.H.I.E.L.D. until Buzz Mason mind-controlled her into stealing a device that will allow Buzz to control the GUARDSTAR. Lightwave is based on Aurora and Darkstar.
 Videoman - Electro brought it out of an arcade game to steal components for his Ultra-Transformer, but was defeated by the Spider-Friends. Videoman was released again during a thunderstorm. A teenage video game prodigy named Francis Byte (voiced by Frank Welker) ends up becoming Videoman due to an explosion caused by the Gamesman's plot where Francis learns to become a good superhero. After the Gamesman's defeat, he is now training with the X-Men.

Spider-Man (1994 TV series)

 Alisha Silvermane (voiced by Leigh-Allyn Baker) - In this series, she is Silvermane's daughter.
 Iceberg (voiced by Lawrence Mandley) - He was a frozen crime lord that works for the Kingpin and that Hobbie Brown used to work for before becoming the Prowler.
 Lizard Warriors - A group of normal lizards in the sewer that were mutated by Curt Connors' DNA that was leaked into the sewers. They began to rever Curt Connors as their father and wanted his Lizard side to lead them. With help from Debra Whitman and Martha Connors, Spider-Man and Mary Jane Watson helped to cure Lizard with a special bomb that also regressed the Lizard Warriors back to their normal forms.
 Monitor (voiced by Rodney Saulsberry) - Member of the Lizard Warriors.
 Gecko (voiced by Roger Kern) - Member of the Lizard Warriors.
 Gila (voiced by Kathy Garver) - Member of the Lizard Warriors. She later helped Spider-Man, Mary Jane Watson, Debra Whitman, and Marth Connors in curing Lizard and returning all Lizard Warriors including herself back to normal.
 Miriam (voiced by Nichelle Nichols) - In this series, she is a Vampire Queen and the mother of Blade.

Spider-Man: The New Animated Series (2003)

 Dr. Zellner (voiced by Jeffrey Combs) - He developed a drug that would make stupid people intelligent. He tested it on thug twins Jack and Mack and used them to commit crimes.
 The Gaines Twins (voiced by Jeremy Piven and Kathy Griffin) - Roland and Roxanne Gaines are ruthless telepathic twins. They held a vendetta against Kraven the Hunter for killing their parents with a poison (that, ironically, also gave the Twins their powers) and almost manipulated Spider-Man into killing him.
 Piranha - An assassin who, disguised as a European Union member named Harlan Tremain, targeted the Mayor of New York and the President. The Silver Sable attacked him, although Spider-Man thought she was the enemy at first.
 Pterodax - Pterodax is a high-tech mercenary group.
 Sergei (voiced by James Marsters) - Leader of Pterodax.
 Aleksei (voiced by Brendan Connolly) - Member of Pterodax.
 Boris (voiced by Ken Lerner) - Member of Pterodax.
 Shikata (voiced by Gina Gershon) - Shikata is a martial arts expert and swordsman who uses a mystical sword and incantation to stay young. Seeing Spider-Man as a worthy foe, she wanted to fight him to the death. At first Spider-Man refused, but after Shikata threatened Mary Jane, he ended up dueling her. Spider-Man destroyed the sword ending Shikata's prolonged life.
 Talon (voiced by Eve) - Cheyenne Tate is a high-tech thief who was a love interest for Harry Osborn. She is somewhat based on Black Cat.
 Turbo Jet (voiced by Harold Perrineau) - As Turbo Jet, Wyler acts like a modern-day Robin Hood with the stealing from the rich and giving to the poor while wearing a high-tech suit. He is said to be based on Rocket Racer.

Ultimate Spider-Man (2012)

 Boston Terroriers - A group of lesser Boston criminals stopped by Spider-Man who were given high-tech armor by Steel Spider.
 Plymouth Rocker (voiced by Maurice LaMarche) - A common Boston criminal who is given a giant high-tech armor suit by Steel Spider. Plymouth Rocker's exoskeleton enhances his hand-to-hand combat skills as well as giving him super-strength and being able to climb vertical walls. He is named after Plymouth Rock.
 Salem's Witch (voiced by Misty Lee) - A Boston museum thief who is given high-tech armor by Steel Spider. Salem's Witch has anti-gravity disk beneath her boots enabling her to fly and laser-shooting bracelets. She is named after the Salem witch trials.
 Slam Adams (voiced by Jeff Bennett) - A Boston robber given high-tech patriot armor by Steel Spider. Slam Adams also wields a shield. He is named after Samuel Adams.
 Wolf Spider (voiced by Christopher Daniel Barnes) - A version of Peter Parker from another universe and the main antagonist of the "Return to the Spider-Verse" episodes in Season 4. Unlike most versions of Peter Parker who stood for heroism and responsibility, Wolf Spider became a villainous madman. In that time before the Siege of Perilous came to his universe, Wolf Spider put everyone including his world's Miles Morales into misery.

Video games

A number of Spider-Man villains have made appearances in Spider-Man video games series or other Marvel Comics related shows mostly in other games. Here is a listing in alphabetical order.

Novels, theatre and radio
Spider-Man villains that were introduced in novels, theatre productions and radio programs.

The Gentleman

For decades, the wealthy and misanthropic Gustav Fiers controlled a criminal organisation. Fiers had a lethal reputation in the criminal underworld, known for conducting elaborate plans to increase his own wealth, involved behind the scenes in various significant events in global history. Gustav Fiers eventually learned that Richard and Mary Parker, two agents under his employ, were double agents working for the United States government. When the Parkers were hired by Albert Malik, Fiers informed Malik of their disloyalty. Malik hired Gustav Fiers' brother, the Finisher, to kill the Parkers. The Finisher succeeded in doing so but, decades later, was killed in a battle with the Parkers' son, Spider-Man.

Lesser threats

References

Enemies
Enemies, List of Spider-Man